All I Wish (also titled A Little Something for Your Birthday) is a 2017 American romantic comedy film written and directed by Susan Walter and starring Sharon Stone (who was also a producer), Tony Goldwyn, Famke Janssen and Ellen Burstyn.  It is Walter's directorial debut.

Premise
Senna Berges (Sharon Stone), a clothing designer, is desperate to find her soulmate. Despite the constant attempts to pursue her passion for fashion design, Senna follows a path of irresponsible behavior, changing jobs and having occasional relationships with younger men. Everything seems to be out of control for Senna until her 46th birthday party where she meets Adam (Tony Goldwyn).

Cast
Sharon Stone as Senna Berges, Celia's daughter
Tony Goldwyn as Adam
Ellen Burstyn as Celia Berges, Senna's mother
Famke Janssen as Vanessa
Liza Lapira as Darla
Erica Ash as Nikki
Caitlin FitzGerald as Alison
Gilles Marini as Jean-Michel
Jason Gibson as Steve

Production
Walter's script was included in the 2008 Black List.  In 2009, Michael Engler was attached to direct the film as a co-production between Anonymous Content and Overture Films.

Filming began in October 2016.

Release
The film premiered at the Pacific Design Center in Los Angeles on May 3, 2017.

The film was released on DVD on May 1, 2018.

Reception
On review aggregator website Rotten Tomatoes, the film holds an approval rating of 16%, based on 19 reviews, and an average rating of 4.2/10. On Metacritic, the film has a weighted average score of 49 out of 100, based on 9 critics, indicating "mixed or average reviews".

Jeffrey M. Anderson of Common Sense Media awarded the film two stars out of five.  Derek Smith of Slant Magazine awarded the film one and a half stars out of four.

Katie Walsh of the Los Angeles Times gave the film a positive review and wrote, "Stone had the right instincts about the part — she inhabits Senna beautifully, and her performance anchors the light-as-air All I Wish. It's the perfect role for her to sink her teeth into, sexy and fun, but she brings a sense of real intelligence and soulfulness to the character. That's true star power."

Adam Graham of The Detroit News graded the film a C.

Teo Bugbee of The New York Times criticized the script of the film, calling it "generic."

References

External links
 
 
 

2017 films
American romantic comedy films
CineTel Films films
Universal Pictures films
Films about fashion designers
2017 directorial debut films
2010s English-language films
2017 romantic comedy films
2010s American films